Kagerup is a village in the Gribskov Municipality in North Zealand, Denmark. It is located six kilometers southeast of Helsinge and 10 kilometers north of Hillerød. As of 2022, it had a population of 396.

References 

Cities and towns in the Capital Region of Denmark
Gribskov Municipality